K2-18, also known as EPIC 201912552, is a red dwarf star located  from Earth, in the constellation of Leo.

Planetary system
The star has an exoplanet, called K2-18b, a super-Earth located within the habitable zone of K2-18.  It is the first exoplanet in the habitable zone, albeit a hydrogen-rich sub-neptune, to have water discovered in its atmosphere. The star also has a second planet K2-18c, which is proven by system tidal simulation to be a small gas giant.

References 

Leo (constellation)
M-type main-sequence stars
Planetary systems with one confirmed planet
J11301450+0735180